Anoplolepis nuptialis is a species of ant in the genus Anoplolepis. It is native to South Africa.

References

Formicinae
Insects of South Africa
Hymenoptera of Africa
Taxonomy articles created by Polbot
Insects described in 1917
Taxa named by Felix Santschi